The 1929 Kilkenny Intermediate Hurling Championship was the inaugural staging of the Kilkenny Intermediate Hurling Championship since its establishment by the Kilkenny County Board. The championship consisted of just one game between the two divisional championship winners.

The final was played on 23 February 1930 at Nowlan Park in Kilkenny, between Urlingford and Kilmacow, in what was their first meeting in a final. Urlingford won the match by 6–00 to 2–01 to claim their first championship title.

Qualification

Results

Final

References

External links
 Kilkenny GAA website

Kilkenny Intermediate Hurling Championship
Kilkenny Intermediate Hurling Championship